

The following is a list of reservoirs and lakes in the U.S. state of Texas.

A
Lake Abilene
Addicks Reservoir
Lake Alan Henry
Alvarado Park Lake
Amistad Reservoir (extends into Coahuila, Mexico)
Lake Amon G. Carter
Lake Anahuac (once known as Turtle Bay)
Aquilla Lake
Lake Arlington (Texas)
Lake Arrowhead
Lake Athens (formerly known as Flat Creek Reservoir)
Lake Austin
Averhoff Reservoir

B
Lake B. A. Steinhagen
Balmorhea Lake
Lake Bardwell
Lake Bastrop
Baylor Creek Reservoir
Lake Bellwood
Belton Lake
Benbrook Lake
Big Creek Reservoir
Big Lake
Lake Bob Sandlin
Lake Boehmer
Bonham City Lake
Bonham State Park Lake
Boerne City Lake
Brady Creek Reservoir
Brandy Branch Reservoir
Braunig Lake
Lake Brelsford
Lake Bridgeport (formerly known as Bridgeport Reservoir)
Lake Brownwood
Lake Bryan
Lake Bryson
Lake Buchanan
Buffalo Creek Reservoir
Buffalo Springs Reservoir

C

Caddo Lake (extends into Louisiana)
Calaveras Lake
Canyon Lake
Lake Casa Blanca
Cedar Creek Reservoir
Champion Creek Reservoir
Lake Charlotte
Lake Cherokee
Lake Childress
Choke Canyon Reservoir
Lake Cisco
Lake Pat Cleburne
Lake Clyde
Coffee Mill Lake
Coleto Creek Reservoir
Lake Coleman

Lake Conroe
Cooper Lake (see Jim Chapman Lake)
Lake Corpus Christi
Lake Crook
Lake Cypress Springs

D
Lake Daniel
 Davy Crockett Lake
Lake Diversion
Lake Dunlap

E
Eagle Mountain Lake
Lake Eanes
Lake Eddleman
Lake El Paso
E.V. Spence Reservoir

F
Fairfield Lake
Falcon International Reservoir
Fayette County Reservoir
Lake Findley
Lake Fork
Fort Parker State Park Lake
Fort Phantom Hill Lake
Lake Fryer (originally known as Wolf Creek Lake)

G
Lake Georgetown (formerly known as North Fork Lake, and Georgetown Dam)
Gibbons Creek Reservoir
Lake Gilmer
Lake Gladewater
Lake Gonzales
Lake Graham
Lake Granbury
Granger Lake
Grapevine Lake
Greenbriar Lake
Green Lake
Greenbelt Reservoir

H
Lake Halbert
Lake Hawkins
Lake Holbrook
Hords Creek Reservoir
Lake Houston
Houston County Lake
Hubbard Creek Lake
Howell Lake
Hamrick Lake

I
Imperial Reservoir
Inks Lake

J
Lake J. B. Thomas
Lake Jacksonville
Lake Jane
Jim Chapman Lake
Joe Pool Lake

K
Lake Kemp
Lake Kickapoo
Kirby Lake
Lake Kurth

L

Lady Bird Lake (formerly Town Lake)
Lake La Joya
Lake Creek Lake
Lake Fork Reservoir
Lake Lavon
Lake Leon (Eastland County, Texas)
Lake Leon (Pecos County, Texas)
Lewisville Lake
Lake Limestone
Lake Livingston
Lost Creek Reservoir
Lake Lyndon B. Johnson
Lake O' the Pines

M

Mackenzie Reservoir
Lake Marble Falls
Lake Marvin (Hemphill County, Texas)
Lake McClellan (McClellan Reservoir)
McGovern Lake, Hermann Park, Houston
Lake McQueeney
Lake McSpadden
Meadow Lake
Medina Lake
Lake Meredith
Lake Mexia
Millers Creek Reservoir
Lake Mineral Wells
Mitchell Lake
Lake Monticello
Moss Lake, Howard County
Mountain Creek Lake   
Mud Lake
Murphy Lake, Anderson County
Lake Murvaul, Panola County
Mustang Lake
Lake Meredith National Recreation Area

N
Lake Nacogdoches
Lake Naconiche
Lake Nasworthy
Navarro Mills Lake
Negrohead Lake
New Ballinger Lake
Lake Nocona
North Lake (disambiguation)

O
O.C. Fisher Reservoir
O.H. Ivie Lake
Oak Creek Reservoir

P

Padera Lake 
Lake Palestine
Palo Duro Reservoir
Lake Palo Pinto
Lake Pat Cleburne
Pat Mayse Lake
Lake Pauline
Lake Pflugerville
Lake Pinkston
Lake Placid
Lake Plainview
Possum Kingdom Lake (Possum Kingdom Reservoir)
Proctor Lake
Purtis Creek State Park Lake

Q
Lake Quitman

R
Lake Randell
Lake Raven
Lake Ray Hubbard
Lake Ray Roberts
Red Bluff Reservoir
Richland-Chambers Reservoir   
Rucker Pond

S
Sabine Lake (extends into Louisiana)
Sam Rayburn Reservoir
Lake Scarborough
Sheldon Reservoir
Smithers Lake
Somerville Lake
Squaw Creek Reservoir
Lake Stamford
Stillhouse Hollow Lake
Lake Striker
Sulphur Springs Lake
Lake Sweetwater

T
Lake Tampacuas
Lake Tanglewood
Lake Tawakoni
Lake Texana
Texas Highland Lakes
Lake Texoma (extends into Oklahoma)
Timpson Reservoir
Toledo Bend Reservoir (extends into Louisiana)
Tradinghouse Creek Reservoir
Lake Travis
Twin Buttes Reservoir
Lake Tyler
Lake Tyler East

V
Victor Braunig Lake

W

Lake Waco
Lake Walter E. Long
Lake Waxahachie
Lake Weatherford
Lake Welsh
White River Reservoir
White Rock Lake
Lake Whitney
Wichita Reservoir
Lake Winnsboro
Lake Wood
Lake Worth
Wright Patman Lake

See also

List of lakes in Oklahoma
List of lakes in Louisiana
List of geographical regions in Texas

External links
Texas Parks and Wildlife List of Texas Lakes

Lakes
Texas